The 1998 UEFA Champions League final was a football match that took place at the Amsterdam Arena in Amsterdam, on 20 May 1998 to determine the winner of the 1997–98 UEFA Champions League. It pitted Real Madrid of Spain and Juventus of Italy. Juventus appeared in their third consecutive final, while Real Madrid were in their first of the Champions League era. Real Madrid won 1–0, to clinch their record breaking seventh European title, their first title for 32 years. The only goal was scored by Predrag Mijatović. The two teams would face each other in the final again in 2017.

Venue

The Amsterdam Arena has served as the home stadium of Ajax since 1996. The previous home for Ajax's European matches, the Olympisch Stadion, also hosted European finals.

One-legged finals include the 1962 European Cup final, in which Benfica defeated Real Madrid 5–3, and the 1977 European Cup Winners' Cup Final, in which Anderlecht were beaten 2–0 by Hamburg. It also hosted the second legs of the 1981 UEFA Cup Final between AZ '67 and Ipswich Town, and of the 1992 UEFA Cup Final between Ajax and Torino.

Route to the final

Match

Details

Statistics

Source: UEFA Champions League Final 1998 Full-Time Report  (deadl link)

See also
1997–98 UEFA Champions League
2017 UEFA Champions League final – contested between same teams
Juventus F.C. in European football
Real Madrid CF in international football competitions

External links
1997–98 season at UEFA.com

References

Final
European Cup Final 1998
European Cup Final 1998
UEFA Champions League Final, 1998
1998
European Cup Final 1998
Champions League Final
1990s in Amsterdam
May 1998 sports events in Europe